Terbaik (The Best) is a greatest hits album by Indonesian band Kotak. It was released on November 12, 2012 by Warner Music Indonesia. The album compiled nine songs from two previous studio albums with four newest songs, "Hijaukan Bumi", "I Love You", "Kecuali Kamu" and "Jet Lag". In marketing this album, Kotak and the record label working with KFC that this album would be circulated in all KFC stores in Indonesia.

Track listing

References 

2012 compilation albums